Greenfield Elementary School may refer to:

Listed alphabetically by state
 Greenfield Elementary School, in Gilbert, Arizona
 Greenfield Elementary School, in Jacksonville, Florida
 Greenfield Elementary School, in Greenfield, New Hampshire
 Greenfield Elementary School (Pittsburgh, Pennsylvania)
 Greenfield Elementary School, in Fort Worth, Texas
 Greenfield Elementary School, in Bon Air, Virginia